The 2018 Wheelchair Basketball World Championship was held at the Edel-optics.de Arena in Hamburg, Germany, from 16 to 26 August 2018. Both men's and women's tournaments were held, with 12 women's and 16 men's teams competing, representing 19 different nations. Each team selected 12 players for the tournament. The men's competition was won by Great Britain, with the United States winning silver and Australia winning bronze. The women's competition was won by the Netherlands, with Great Britain winning silver and the host nation winning bronze.

Medallists

This was the best ever performance at a wheelchair basketball world championship by both the British men's and women's teams. The former had never won an official championship before (they had claimed the 1973 unofficial title), and the latter had never made the finals.

Squads

Each of the 16 men's and 12 women's teams (from 19 different nations) selected a squad of 12 players for the tournament. Athletes are given an eight-level-score specific to wheelchair basketball, ranging from 0.5 to 4.5. Lower scores represent a higher degree of disability. The sum score of all players on the court cannot exceed 14.

Men

Preliminary round

Pool A

Pool B

Pool C

Pool D

Finals

Round of 16

Quarter finals

Semi finals

Bronze medal

Final

Placement matches 
 15th place

 13th place

 11th place

 9th place

 7th place

5th place

Performances

Triple-double

Double-double

All-Star Team

Source:

Final standings

Women

Preliminary round

Pool A

Pool B

Finals

Quarter finals

Semi finals

Bronze medal

Final

Placement matches

Performances

Triple-double

Double-double

All-Star Team

Source:

Final standings

Controversy
During the women's game between China and Algeria, a Chinese coach struck one of his players. When the incident was reported to the Tournament Technical Committee (TTC), it immediately issued a one-match suspension. This was the maximum penalty that it could impose. However, the TTC felt that this penalty was inadequate, and referred the matter to the Secretary General of the International Wheelchair Basketball Federation, Maureen Orchard, who suspended the coach from the tournament.

Notes

External links
 

 
2018 in wheelchair basketball
Wheelchair Basketball World Championship
International basketball competitions hosted by Germany
2018–19 in German basketball
August 2018 sports events in Germany
2018 in disability sport